Guy Wilbur Fiske (September 28, 1924 – November 21, 2021) was an American businessman who served as the United States Deputy Secretary of Commerce from 1982 to 1983. He died in Charlottesville, Virginia on November 21, 2021, at the age of 97.

References

1924 births
2021 deaths
Massachusetts Republicans
United States Deputy Secretaries of Commerce
People from Upton, Massachusetts